The Art Gallery of Burlington, founded in 1978, is the seventh largest public art gallery in Ontario. The Gallery collects and maintains Canada's largest collection of contemporary Canadian ceramics. It is located on the City of Burlington waterfront in close proximity to Spencer Smith Park.

History 

It was formed by several active visual arts co-operatives and guilds in the Burlington region. It was opened in 1978 as a facility for art groups to develop dedicated studios, photography, hand weaving, spinning, sculpture, woodcarving, ceramics, fine arts, and hooking craft know today as Arts Burlington. The Gallery expanded and it started to become a public art gallery with exhibitions, publications, and a collection (begun in 1983) of contemporary Canadian ceramic art and educational programs. The facility has undergone two capital expansions in 1991 and 2001.

Facility 
The Art Gallery operates a 4,100 m². (44,000 sq ft.) facility with exhibition spaces that include the 400 m². (4,200 sq ft.) AIC Gallery, the 40 m². (400 sq ft.) F.R. (Bob) Perry Gallery, a collection atrium, multiple display cases throughout the facility for works in the collection, and a 225 m². (2,400 sq ft.) exterior courtyard for site-specific exhibitions. The educational programs have 10 studio/classrooms.  Meeting rooms, gallery shop, café and offices account for 1,400 m². (15,000 sq ft.).

See also
 Spencer Smith Park
 Craft Ontario

External links

Arts Burlington

Art museums and galleries in Ontario
Buildings and structures in Burlington, Ontario
Arts centres in Canada
Museums in the Regional Municipality of Halton
Art museums established in 1978
1978 establishments in Ontario